Hopewell, also known as Hopewell Mills and Hopewell Farm, was established around 1765 by William Little, Sr., who built grain and saw mills near the Shenandoah River. In 1827, William Little, Jr. sold the property to James Hite and Jacob Newcomer.  Hite named the property "Hopewell", identifying the mill with a place in Leetown also named Hopewell, where there was a Quaker meeting house. Hite's descendant, Thomas Hite Willis, operated and expanded the mill, adding a woolen mill.  The woolen mill operated until the 1920s providing uniforms for the Army.

The complex includes a log-and-clapboard house, built circa 1765 with twentieth century additions, a tenant house (known as the "Viand Cottage") from the same era and of similar construction, several outbuildings and the ruins of the woolen mill, circa 1850.

References

Houses on the National Register of Historic Places in West Virginia
Houses in Jefferson County, West Virginia
Vernacular architecture in West Virginia
Farms on the National Register of Historic Places in West Virginia
National Register of Historic Places in Jefferson County, West Virginia
Houses completed in 1765
Colonial architecture in West Virginia
Log buildings and structures on the National Register of Historic Places in West Virginia